Lawrence E. Moore (July 10, 1942 – March 12, 2016) was an American professional basketball player. He played for the American Basketball Association's Anaheim Amigos during the 1967–68 season.

Moore is a native of South Bend, Indiana. He entered the United States Navy after high school, and after serving he enrolled in Florida State University. Moore was on the basketball team at the Seminoles.

Moore died on March 12, 2016, at his home in Mountain Iron, Minnesota.

References

1944 births
2016 deaths
American men's basketball players
Anaheim Amigos players
Basketball players from South Bend, Indiana
Florida State Seminoles men's basketball players
Forwards (basketball)